Three ships of the Royal Navy have borne the name HMS Conquest:

  was a 12-gun gunvessel launched in 1794 and sold in 1817.
  was a screw corvette launched in 1878 and sold in 1899.
  was a  light cruiser launched in 1915 and sold in 1930.

See also
 

Royal Navy ship names